The 1987 Masters (also known as the 1987 Nabisco Masters for sponsorship reasons) was a men's tennis tournament held in Madison Square Garden, New York City, United States between 30 November and 4 December 1987.  Whilst the doubles event was held at the Royal Albert Hall in London, United Kingdom. It was the year-end championships for the 1987 Nabisco Grand Prix.

Finals

Singles

 Ivan Lendl defeated  Mats Wilander, 6–2, 6–2, 6–3.

Doubles

 Tomáš Šmíd /  Miloslav Mečíř defeated  Ken Flach /  Robert Seguso 6–4, 7–5, 6–7, 6–3.

References

 
Nabisco Masters
Grand Prix tennis circuit year-end championships
Tennis tournaments in New York City
1987 in American tennis
1987 in sports in New York City
1987 in English tennis
1987 sports events in London
Tennis in London